Ursula Dirichs is a German actress born in Recklinghausen in 1935.

Early life
Ursula Dirichs was born in the northern Ruhr area and grew up in Königsberg. She took acting lessons at the Otto-Falkenberg-Schule in Munich, and returned to the Ruhr to begin her acting career; she worked in Oberhausen, then at the Schauspielhaus Bochum. She has worked in various cities in Germany, Austria, Switzerland and the Netherlands.

TV career
Her first major appearance in television was in 1960 in the fledgling German television: On the beach of the green river Spree, based on a book by Hans Scholz, in which she played two roles. In the third sequence, set after the Battle of Kunersdorf, she played the girl Hannah, and in the fourth part, the role of the "goat princess" Bärbel Kroll. She has acted in 60 films and television playing large and small roles.

Since the 1960s, she was also in radio in a variety of roles, such as Horst Tappert in a radio adaptation of Bertolt Brecht's The Threepenny Opera, the multi-part thriller, La Boutique by Francis Durbridge and the children's radio drama The daisies'.

Filmography
 1960: Am grünen Strand der Spree, Part 3: "Prussian Fairytale" (Hannah) - TV miniseries - Director: Fritz Umgelter, with Elisabeth Müller, Peter Pasetti, Peter Thom
 1960: Am grünen Strand der Spree, Part 4: "Bastien und Bastienne 1953" (Bärbel Kroll) - TV miniseries - Director: Fritz Umgelter, with Elisabeth Müller, Peter Pasetti, Fritz Rasp
 1963: The State of Siege (by Albert Camus) (daughter of the judge) - TV film - Director: Fritz Umgelter, with Wolfgang Kieling, Hilde Krahl, Richard Münch
 1966: Ten Percent (Mrs Frühwirth) - TV film - Director: Theo Mezger, with Klaus Schwarzkopf, Jochen Brockmann, Peter Schütte
 1966: Yesterday Girl - (Anita G.) (Mother - Director: Alexander Kluge, with Alexandra Kluge, Hans Korte, Edith Kuntze-Pellogio
 1967: The Arrangement (editor) - TV film - Director: Günter Gräwert, with Alexander Kerst, Luitgard Im, Hans Caninenberg
 1971: The Constant Wife (by William Somerset Maugham) (Martha Culver) - TV film - Director: Wolfgang Liebeneiner, with Anaid Iplicjian, Werner Bruhns, Ida Honor
 1971: Visit to a Small Planet (Bella Spelding) - TV film - Director: Wolfgang Liebeneiner, wirh Peter Fricke, Peter Pasetti, Klaus Schwarzkopf
 1971: Two Letters to Pospischiel (Gerda) - TV film - Director: Roland Gall, with Eberhard Fechner, Dorothea Thiess, Birgit Leister
 1972: Alpha Alpha - TV series, Episode: "Like Rats" (Ms. King) - Director: Wolfgang F. Henschel, with Karl Michael Vogler, Lilith Ungerer, Arthur Brauss
 1972: The Piano (Lottchen) - TV film - Director: Fritz Umgelter, with Anneliese Uhlig, Günter Strack, Maria Körber
 1973: Victor, or Children of the Power (by Jean Anouilh) (Lili) - TV film - Director: Tom Toelle, with Vadim Glowna, Ulli Philipp, Ingeborg Engelmann
 1973: Tatort - TV series, Episode: A very ordinary murder - Regie: Dieter Wedel, with Hans Häckermann, Til Erwig, Hans Helmut Dickow
 1979: Balthasar in a Traffic Jam (Tourists Women) - TV film - Director: Rudolf Jugert, with Heinz Rühmann, Cornelia Froboess, Louise Martini
 1979: The Buddenbrooks (after Thomas Mann) (Ida Jungmann) - TV series - Director: Franz Peter Wirth, with Carl Raddatz, Martin Benrath, Ruth Leuwerik
 1980: On the Southern Slope (from Mrs. Wallbaum) - TV film - Director: Michael Verhoeven, with Andrea Jonasson, Helmut Zierl, Franz-Otto Krüger
 1982: Stella (by Johann Wolfgang von Goethe) - TV film - Director: , with Dietlinde Turban, Judy Winter, Robert Atzorn
 1983: Derrick - TV series, Episode: "The Culprit Sends Flowers" - Director: Helmut Ashley, with Horst Tappert, Fritz Wepper, Ruth Leuwerik
 1988: The Absurdity of Love (Elsa) - TV film - Director: Radu Gabrea, with Erich Bar, Ingeborg lapsi, Trude Breitschopf
 1989: Tiger, Lion, Panther - TV film - Director: Dominik Graf, with Natja Brunckhorst, Martina Gedeck, Sabine Kaack
 1989: Derrick - TV series, Episode: "The Second Murder" - Director: Zbyněk Brynych, with Horst Tappert, Fritz Wepper, Esther Haussmann
 1989: Heart Over Head (Margaret) - TV film - Director: Martin Theo Krieger, with Adriana Altaras, Dominik Bender, Helga Pedross
 1990: Moffengriet: Love Is Doing What She Wants (mother Verspohl) - TV film - Director: Eberhard Itzenplitz, with Anne Marie Standing, Konstantin Graudus, Edda Barend
 1990: Player - Director: Dominik Graf, with Susanne Carlevaris, Hansa Czypionka, Jean Daugen
 1991: Private Lives - Director: Dušan Hanák, with Zuzana Cigánová, Danciak Stano, Michal Docolomanský
 1992: The Goddess of Revenge - TV film - Director: Wolfgang Panzer, with Lola Müthel, Hans Lobitz, Emilio De Marchi
 1993: Happy Holiday - TV series, Episode: "Tizias Lie" (Lisbeth) - Directed by: Heidi Kranz, Erich Neureuther, with Claudia Lössl, Ralph Schicha
 1995: The Life After: Heavenly Prospects (Mother) - Directed by: Jörg Lühdorff, with Robert Meller, Anette Hellwig, Volkmar Kleinert
 1996: Trip to Weimar (Garancij Marta Wolff) - TV film - Director: Dominik Graf, with Barbara Auer, Rose Marie Fendel, Walter Schultheiss
 1999: Annaluise & Anton (after Erich Kästner) (teacher) - Director: Caroline Link, with Elea Geissler, Max Fields, Juliane Köhler
 2004: Endlich Sex! (Saskias grandma) - TV film - Director: Klaus Knösel, with Jasmin Schwiers, Gil Ofarim, Christian Blümel

Radio dramas
 1964: The Tears of the Blind (Crazy) - Director: Günther Sauer, with John Schauer, Wolfgang Schirlitz, Udo Vioff
 1967: La Boutique (after Francis Durbridge) (Eve Bristol) - Director: Dieter Munck, with Karl Michael Vogler, Alwin Michael Rueff, Wolfgang Weiser
 1968: Die Dreigroschenoper (after Bertolt Brecht) (Lucy) - Director: Ulrich Lauterbach, with Horst Tappert, Willy Trenk-Trebitsch, Heidemarie Hatheyer
 1972: Hey Hey, Its Women and Girls (Ida Stommeln, seller) - Directed by: Otto Düben, with Dirk Dautzenberg, Irene Marhold, Karin Buchali
 1976: Treibsand (Lona Bridges) - Directed by: Otto Düben, with Claus Biederstaedt, Susanne Beck, Thessy Kuhls
 1977: The Dwarfs in the City (Olga, sister of Professor) - Director: Urs Widmer, with Eric Kraut Schild, Erika von Thellmann, Wolfgang Höper
 1980: Sparkling Red (Madame Colette) - Directed by: Otto Düben, with Ruth Drexel, Elisabeth Justin, Walter Lenz
 1981: The Duration of the Piano Players - Director: Walter Adler, with Dieter Laser, Elisabeth Schwarz, Peter Roggisch
 1981: Noblesse oblige (Lady Bowington) - Directed by: Otto Düben, with Horst Bollmann, Witta Pohl, Hans Baur
 1988: The Assassination (after Harry Mulisch) - Director: Hans Gerd Krogmann, Peter Fitz, Benjamin Tholen, Friedrich W. Bauschulte
 1989: The Daisies (cat) - Director: Raoul Wolfgang Schnell, with Heinz Schimmelpfennig, Verena von Behr, Charles Wirths
 1991: The Hitchhiker's Guide to Space (after The Hitchhiker's Guide to the Galaxy by Douglas Adams) (The unobtrusive Losverkäuferin) - Director: Hartmut Kirste, with Rolf Boysen, Felix von Manteuffel, Ingo Hülsmann

References

External links
  
 

1935 births
German radio actresses
Living people
German film actresses
German television actresses
Date of birth missing (living people)